Bara Kanthalia is a village in Kanthalia Union of Kathalia Upazila in the Jhalokati District of Barisal Division of southern-central Bangladesh.

Picture

References

External links 

 Kathalia Union Official Govt. Website

Villages in Jhalokati District
Villages in Barisal Division